Golmaal Hai Bhai Sab Golmaal Hai is an Indian romcom that was aired on SAB TV. It was a reboot of former comedy series Sajan Re Jhoot Mat Bolo with the cast from the original one.

Plot
Dhanwantrilal Dhyanchand Dholakia, alias 3D, is entirely against love marriages and has decreed that no member of the family can marry till his beloved unmarried sister Pari, a Music lover, well past middle age, finds her perfect match. Sachin is a simple Marathi guy who loves 3D's niece Dhwani. 3D wants his niece to marry a man who has 32 qualities. Her uncle employs a man named Baabul Chabeesguna for a vacancy as his manager. On the day Baabul arrives at the airport, Sachin and his funny friend Raju kidnap him. Disguised as Baabul, Sachin sets on a mission to impress his uncle by showing 32 qualities and win his love Dhwani. Soon 3D orders Baabul to find Sur Samrat Sarangiwale. Baabul and Raju finds him in the Himalayas, but he escapes from their vehicle upon reaching Mumbai. Then his same close friend Raju is seen masquerading as Sur Samrat Sarangiwale. Baabul loses one quality because of organizing 3D's birthday without asking him because it is also the death anniversary of Dwani's mother. But 3D gives him a week to reclaim it. Baabul (Sachin) goes on to organize the birthday party for him, citing that 3D's late sister doesn't like 3D to be sad. He likes the party so much that he gives Baabul (Sachin), 2 days more to get his quality. In the party 3D requests Sur Samrat Sarangiwale, (Raju) to sing a song he heard at a fair in Delhi. Raju becomes afraid and is about to confess that he is not the Sur Samrat. Sachin offers to sing the famous song Ek Chatur Naar from Padosan from behind the chair for which Raju only needs to mime and lip-sync with Sachin, thereby saving them both from their secrets being exposed. Yet in the party, 3D gets to know the real Baabul and thus Sachin's real identity is understood by all, (but Raju's disguise isn't revealed). Another shock is received when his other brothers - Dhoti and Dhawal, confess their love for the disguising cook Ananoya (a playartist in a theater by profession) and her assistant Suzi (a thief by profession) respectively. 3D now after a huge reconsideration, dumps his 'guna or quality theory' and endorses everyone will be married with their loved ones.

Cast
Swapnil Joshi as Sachin / Baabul (disguised)
Tiku Talsania as Dhanwantrilal Dhyanchand Dholakia (3D)
Apara Mehta as Pari (3D's sister)
Mugdha Chaphekar as Dhwani (3D's niece)
Sukesh Anand as Dhoti (3D's amnesiac brother)
Shalini Khanna as Anushka
Manoj Goyal as Dhawall (3D's ailing brother)
Melissa Pais as Suzi
Rajiv Thakur as Raju / Sur Samraat Saarangi Waale
Sumeet Raghavan as Himself

References

External links
 

Sony SAB original programming
Indian comedy television series
2012 Indian television series debuts
2012 Indian television series endings
Television series by Optimystix Entertainment